Marwan Al-Sahafi (born 17 February 2004) is a Saudi Arabian professional footballer who plays as a winger for Pro League side Al-Ittihad.

Club career
Al-Sahafi began his career at the youth team of Al-Ittihad. On 12 June 2022, Al-Sahafi signed his first professional contract with the club. He made his debut on 7 October 2022 in the 3–1 win against Al-Fateh by coming off the bench. On 11 October 2022, Al-Sahafi made his first start for the club in the 1–1 draw against Damac.

On 27 February 2023, Al-Sahafi was called up to the Saudi Arabia under-20 national team to participate in the 2023 AFC U-20 Asian Cup.

Career statistics

Club

Honours
Al-Ittihad
Saudi Super Cup: 2022

References

External links
 
 

2004 births
Living people
Association football wingers
Saudi Arabian footballers
Ittihad FC players
Saudi Professional League players